BBC Radio 5 Sports Extra (formerly BBC Radio 5 Live Sports Extra) is a national digital radio station in the United Kingdom, operated by the BBC, and specialising in extended live sports coverage. It is a sister station to BBC Radio 5 Live and shares facilities, presenters and management, and is a department of the BBC North Group division.

If a major news story breaks during the live sport broadcasts on 5 Live, the sports coverage may sometimes be redirected and continued on 5 Sports Extra, while 5 Live switches to live news.

The station is only available on digital radio, television platforms and BBC Sounds. Due to licensing reasons, international streaming of the station has not been available since 25 July 2016.

According to RAJAR, the station broadcasts to a weekly audience of 1.6 million with a listening share of 0.5% as of December 2022.

History

BBC Radio Five Live Sports Extra launched as part of the BBC's expansion into digital radio by launching several digital only stations that would complement existing coverage. At the time of launch, all radio sports coverage was included as part of BBC Radio 5 Live's mix of news and sport, the longwave frequencies of BBC Radio 4 or on individual BBC Local Radio stations. As these platforms could not accommodate any additional sports, a new service was launched: BBC Radio Five Live Sports Extra. The station began broadcasts at 2:30pm on 2 February 2002. Juliette Ferrington introduced the first programme – commentary of the Premier League match between Manchester United and Sunderland.

In 2007, the station was rebranded in line with the rest of the network. The new BBC Radio 5 Live Sports Extra logo was turned into a circular based logo in the colour green; according to research, the green colour was chosen as people associated it with sport. In addition, a new background of blue and red diagonal lines on the same green colour was adopted for promotions for the service. Along with the rebrand, Sports Extra became more closely aligned with 5 Live. As a result, the online presence of the station was toned down with only an upcoming schedule remaining; all other details were merged into the 5 Live website or the new BBC Radio online homepage.

In 2011 the station, along with 5 Live, moved to MediaCityUK in Salford.

In 2022, the station's name was shortened to Radio 5 Sports Extra as part of a rebranding of the BBC.

Broadcast
 
BBC Radio 5 Sports Extra is broadcast only on digital platforms. It is transmitted on DAB Digital Radio and on digital television through satellite services, such as Sky and Freesat, cable operators, such as Virgin Media, DTT services via Freeview, and on IPTV. The service is also available online through the BBC website, the BBC Sounds service and the Radioplayer service part owned by the BBC. The BBC Sounds platform also re-broadcasts programmes for catch-up after original broadcast. Due to rights restrictions, some programmes are restricted to UK audiences or are not available on the BBC's online services.

The station is a part-time service, only airing during ongoing sports broadcasts. The broadcasts themselves are live and uninterrupted, unlike sports coverage on Radio 5 Live (which breaks for regular news bulletins) and Radio 4 Longwave (which adds regular scheduled opt-outs such as The Daily Service and the Shipping Forecast into coverage). During Sports Extra's downtime, the station does not simulcast any other broadcast. A label for Sports Extra is continuously radiated on the DAB multiplex to allow those tuning their radio to store the station to their device even if it is not on air. On digital TV platforms, where Sports Extra has its own dedicated full-time stream, not sharing feed capacity with any other services, a looping promotional barker is played if no live programming is scheduled; the EPG information during this reel will often give details of the next live event to be covered by the station, should this information be available. The Sports Extra internet stream, which used to go off air when live content was not running, now also broadcasts the promo loop.

The station's controller is Jonathan Wall, who is also responsible for 5 Live and is answerable to the BBC North and BBC Audio & Music departments. The station operates from Quay House in MediaCityUK on a single floor alongside 5 Live. Although 5 Sports Extra uses no studio space, the teams required to organise the match coverage are shared with 5 Live. The move to Salford took two months, and occurred alongside 5 Live, in a bid to create a northern media hub and to outsource major production from London. Previously, 5 Sports Extra had been located alongside 5 Live in BBC Television Centre and spread over several floors.

Programming
5 Sports Extra broadcast a variety of sports including:

Test Match Special
Cricket World Cup, ICC Champions Trophy, and Twenty20 World Cup
Royal London One-Day Cup and T20 Blast
Cricket's County Championship
Full broadcasts of Premier League and Home Nation football if games overlap, with 5 Live carrying first-choice in these cases
Major League Baseball's World Series, since 2004
Wimbledon Tennis championships, with the station providing extra court commentary for the first week of the tournament
National Hockey League's Stanley Cup Finals
Tennis Grand Slam tournament coverage of non-final rounds and some other major tennis tournaments
 Formula One motor racing
Action from any other competition broadcast on 5 Live

Through the 2012 season, 5 Live and 5 Live Sports Extra carried NFL late games broadcast on Sunday evening, with coverage taken from Westwood One, except the NFL International Series and Super Bowl, which used BBC-produced commentaries. Absolute Radio 90s acquired the broadcast rights to the NFL beginning in 2013. BBC Radio 5 Live and 5 Live Sports Extra reacquired the rights to NFL games for the 2014–15 playoffs.

See also

BBC Radio 5 Live
BBC Radio 4
BBC Local Radio
Talksport

References

External links

 
5
Sports radio stations in the United Kingdom
Radio stations established in 2002
2002 establishments in the United Kingdom
Radio stations in the United Kingdom
Digital-only radio stations